Midas MSL  (Midas Kohler) is an American music producer and performance artist in the Denver, Colorado area.  They are also the editor of a streetwear clothing line.

Early career 
MSL performed in various Denver bands using their birth name Kohler, including the psych pop group Houses.  In 2011, they adopted the stage name Kitty Crimes. They received recognition for their rap song "Find a Penny" (directed by Jess Paul), which experienced some viral success in 2012. 

MSL soon began incorporating hip hop and R&B influences into their music.  They won Westword's best "Hip Hop (Solo)" award in 2017. Their EP, Crimes of the Kitty, Vol. 2, was released in April 2018,  Critics considered the album as notable for its eclectic styling and thoughtful beat constructions. 

In 2018, MSL was listed as one of "14 Colorado LGBTQ Musicians You Should Know" by 303 Magazine.  Autostraddle  called them "one of 10 incredible queer and trans artists to get you ready for summer.".

Personal life 
MSL is non-binary,  and uses they/them pronouns.

References

External links

American LGBT musicians
Living people
Musicians from Colorado
Queer artists
Year of birth missing (living people)
Non-binary musicians